The marshbirds, Pseudoleistes, are a small genus of icterid birds (family Icteridae). It includes the following species:

 
Taxa named by Philip Sclater
Taxonomy articles created by Polbot